Daud Khan Karrani (died on 12 July 1576) was the last ruler of Bengal's Karrani dynasty as well as the final Sultan of Bengal, reigning from 1572 to 1576. During the reign of his father Sulaiman Khan Karrani, Daud commanded a massive army of 40,000 cavalry, 3,600 elephants, 140,000 infantry and 200 cannons.

Mughal-Bengali war
Daud Khan was discontented to be under the dominion of Mughal Emperor Akbar, therefore he decided to fight against the army of Delhi and remain the conqueror of Bengal.

Invasion of Jamania
Emperor Akbar evaded Daud Khan once Daud invaded Jamania near Ghazipur. The Bengali army razed the Jamania city to the ground and captured its fort. Following this, Akbar finally ordered the governor of Jaunpur, Munim Khan, to proceed against Daud. Munim Khan met his friend Ludi Khan, the Prime Minister of Daud, in Patna and opted for a truce.

The agreement pleased neither Akbar nor Daud. Ludi Khan was later put to death by Daud.

Battle of Patna

In 1573 Munim Khan attacked Bihar, forcing Daud to retreat and take shelter in Patna. Daud sent Katlu Lohani, Gujar Khan Karrani and Sri Hari against the Mughal army. Munim Khan, along with Todar Mal and Mansingh, made the first attack in Hajipur. After a fierce battle, the Bengalis and Afghans were at the verge of victory. However, Akbar then re-captured the neighboring fort of Hajipur, which was the source of rations for the army of his opponent. The Bengalis along with the Afghans fell in distress and retreated to Bengal. Akbar returned to the capital after appointing Munim Khan as the governor of Bihar and Bengal. Todar Mal was also left to assist him.

Battle of Tukaroi

On 3 March 1575 a fierce battle was fought between the Mughals and the Afghans in Tukaroi. The result was a draw and the Afghans retreated to Katak, Orissa. The Mughals captured Tanda, the Afghan capital of Bengal. Munim Khan transferred the capital of Bengal from Tanda to Gaur. In the treaty of Katak, Daud ceded Bengal and Bihar to the Mughals. But he retained only Orissa as his possession. Six months later a plague broke out, and Munim Khan suddenly died in October 1575. The Mughal army was forced to retreat from Eastern Bengal by Kalapahar and Isa Khan. Daud marched from Orissa to successfully re-capture Gaur.

Battle of Rajmahal

Akbar sent a new army under the command of Khan Jahan Quli to face his formidable foe Daud Khan. He captured Teliagarhi and advanced towards Rajmahal. The two armies met in the battlefield of Rajmahal. The battle went on for many days.  As the fight was getting too difficult for Akbar, he requested the governor of Bihar, Muzaffar Khan Turbati and other generals to join him. On the other side Daud was accompanied by other principal Afghan leaders like Junaid, Qutlu Khan and Ismail Khan Lodhi. After a fierce battle on 12 July 1576 Daud was finally defeated and executed.

After his death, Bengal went under direct Mughal rule as Subah with Subahdars being installed.

References

1576 deaths
16th-century Indian Muslims
Karrani dynasty
16th-century Indian monarchs
Indian people of Pashtun descent
Indian people of Afghan descent
16th-century Afghan people
Year of birth unknown